BJ's Wholesale Club Holdings, Inc., commonly referred as BJ's, is an American membership-only warehouse club chain based in Marlborough, Massachusetts, operating on the East Coast of the United States in addition to Ohio, Michigan, and Indiana.

History

The company was started by discount department store chain Zayre in 1984, on the Medford/Malden border in Massachusetts. The company's name was derived from the initials of Beverly Jean Weich, the daughter of Mervyn Weich, the president of the new company. Weich announced his resignation as president in June 1987, and left on August 1. He was replaced by John Levy.

When Zayre Corporation sold the Zayre nameplate to rival discount chain Ames in October 1988, TJX Companies was formed. In 1989, TJX spun off their warehouse division, consisting of BJ's and now-defunct HomeClub (later known as HomeBase, then House2Home), to form Waban, Inc. In August 1997, Waban spun off BJ's to become an independent company, BJ's Wholesale Club, Inc., headquartered in Natick, Massachusetts, while Waban renamed itself to HomeBase, Inc.

In 2011, BJ's was acquired by two private equity firms, Leonard Green & Partners and CVC Capital Partners. It returned to being a public company in 2018.

In 2019, BJ's expanded into Michigan, with a new store in Madison Heights. A second and a third Michigan location have since opened in Taylor and Chesterfield Township, respectively.

Today
As of summer 2020, BJ's operates 216 BJ's clubs in 17 states and employed approximately 25,000 team members (both full- and part-time). Clubs are found in Maine, New Hampshire, Massachusetts, Delaware, Connecticut, Rhode Island, New York, New Jersey, Pennsylvania, Maryland, Virginia, North Carolina,  South Carolina, Georgia, Florida, Ohio, and Michigan. Its major competitors are Costco Wholesale and Sam's Club.

BJ's offers a variety of special benefits to its members. These include "member pricing", a variety of name-brand products at discount wholesale prices, acceptance of all valid manufacturers coupons, and acceptance of many forms of payment (cash, check, ATM/debit cards, all major credit cards, and EBT SNAP benefits).

Memberships at BJ's are required for these benefits and are available to individual consumers and businesses. BJ's memberships normally last for twelve months from the date of purchase and must be renewed yearly. , a standard Inner Circle (individual) membership at BJ's cost $55 per year. In addition, BJ's also has a special "Rewards" membership that may be purchased for an additional $55, allowing 2% of most of a member's purchases to be "rewarded" and redeemed for use towards future BJ's purchases (with the exception of alcohol, gas, and tobacco). Business members may apply to purchase BJ's products for resale, and nonprofit organization members may apply for tax-exempt privileges (where applicable). Members with expired memberships (if they choose not to renew), as well as non-members are allowed to shop, but are assessed a 5-20% surcharge (depending on the club and the circumstances) on their total, and are not allowed to pay by check. However, if non-members keep their receipts and decide to renew their membership or open a new membership, they will be refunded the surcharge and applied towards the membership fee, within seven days. To aid in convenience, most BJ's memberships can be renewed at the register during checkout. BJ's Wholesale Club has a 100% Satisfaction Guarantee on their memberships; therefore a membership can be refunded at any time during that membership period without any 90- or 30-day stipulation.

Many of BJ's clubs offer special services to members, such as car rentals, gas stations, home heating oil, an optical department, propane filling, and vacation packages. These services vary from location to location. , there were 154 clubs with optical departments.  BJ's operated 104 gasoline stations at their clubs. In February 2007, BJ's closed all pharmacies in its clubs.

BJ's Wholesale Club locations frequently stock different varieties of products at different locations. However, all clubs carry the items listed in the coupon book that is published on a monthly basis. However, at certain times, it is not uncommon for a certain club not to carry a new item immediately due to its higher demand.

In March 2010, BJ's announced they would move their corporate headquarters from Natick to Westborough, Massachusetts in 2011. On January 5, 2011, BJ's announced it would close five underperforming stores in the Southeast, eliminate approximately 100 headquarters jobs by the end of the month, and restructure its home office and some field operations. Its restructuring moves would result in savings of 78 to 82 cents per share for its fiscal fourth quarter.

On December 19, 2019, BJ's named Lee Delaney as its next CEO starting February 2, 2020. Delaney had been an executive vice president and chief growth officer of the company since 2016. Then CEO Chris Baldwin became executive chairman. Following Delaney's death on April 8, 2021, BJ's financial chief Bob Eddy took over as interim CEO. On April 20, 2021, Bob Eddy’s interim status was removed and he was given the permanent CEO position.

In November 2021, BJ’s announced plans to expand to La Vergne, Tennessee. The announcement of the club in La Vergne will represent the first BJ’s Club in Tennessee.

Brands

House brands

BJ's Wholesale Club regularly markets numerous products under its own private labels—including products by Richelieu Foods.
 Berkley-Jensen (formerly 'Berkley & Jensen'): BJ's private-label products, including non-food general merchandise and sundries items.
 Wellsley Farms: BJ's upscale, private-label line of fresh foods, which includes a full selection of dairy products, produce, juices, and fresh heat-and-eat meals

Other brands
Additionally, BJ's carries many organic and natural food brands such as Kerrygold, Amy's Kitchen, Kashi, Newman's Own and American Flatbread.

Distribution centers
BJ's utilizes three cross-dock distribution centers along with third-party warehouse space when extra storage is needed.

 Uxbridge, Massachusetts
 Size: 
 Serving clubs in New England
 Owned facility
 Burlington, New Jersey
 Size: 
 Serving Mid-Atlantic clubs
 Leased 
 Jacksonville, Florida
 Size: 
 Serving Southern clubs
 Owned facility

References

External links

Companies based in Massachusetts
Economy of the Northeastern United States
Economy of the Southeastern United States
Discount stores of the United States
Online retailers of the United States
Hypermarkets of the United States
Supermarkets of the United States
Companies listed on the New York Stock Exchange
American companies established in 1984
Retail companies established in 1984
2011 mergers and acquisitions
1984 establishments in Massachusetts
Companies that filed for Chapter 11 bankruptcy in 1988
Companies that filed for Chapter 11 bankruptcy in 1990
2018 initial public offerings